Live from Freedom Hall is a live album by the "post-crash" lineup of southern rock band Lynyrd Skynyrd, released on June 22, 2010 after their eleventh studio album God & Guns. The set includes a CD with 15 live tracks and a DVD of that concert. This is the first Lynyrd Skynyrd album produced by Evan Haiman. Both Ean Evans and Billy Powell died before the release of this album, and it is also their last live album with the band.

Track listing
"Travelin' Man" (Leon Wilkeson, Ronnie Van Zant) - 4:06
"Workin'" (Gary Rossington, Johnny Van Zant, Rickey Medlocke, Hughie Thomasson) - 4:49
"What's Your Name?" (Gary Rossington, Ronnie Van Zant) - 3:51
"That Smell" (Allen Collins, Ronnie Van Zant) - 5:52
"Simple Man" (Gary Rossington, Ronnie Van Zant) - 7:37
"Down South Jukin'" (Gary Rossington, Ronnie Van Zant) - 1:41
"The Needle and the Spoon" (Allen Collins, Ronnie Van Zant) - 2:32
"The Ballad of Curtis Loew" (Allen Collins, Ronnie Van Zant) - 4:36
"Gimme Back My Bullets" (Gary Rossington, Ronnie Van Zant) - 2:11
"Tuesday's Gone" (Allen Collins, Ronnie Van Zant) - 6:19
"Red White and Blue" (Johnny Van Zant, Donnie Van Zant, Brad Warren, Brett Warren) - 5:39
"Gimme Three Steps" (Allen Collins, Ronnie Van Zant) - 6:17
"Call Me the Breeze" (J.J. Cale) - 5:46
"Sweet Home Alabama" (Ed King, Gary Rossington, Ronnie Van Zant) - 6:22
"Free Bird" (Allen Collins, Ronnie Van Zant) - 12:11

Musicians
Gary Rossington-Guitar
Johnny Van Zant-Lead Vocals
Billy Powell-Keyboards
Rickey Medlocke-Guitar, Background Vocals
Michael Cartellone-Drums
Ean Evans-Bass, Background Vocals
Mark Matejka-Guitar, Background Vocals
Dale Krantz-Rossington-Background Vocals
Carol Chase-Background Vocals
Steve Traum-Harmonica

Chart positions

External links
Lynyrd Skynyrd released Live From Freedom Hall CD/DVD set at HotindieNews.com

Lynyrd Skynyrd live albums
2010 live albums
Roadrunner Records live albums